Mafkar Sharqi (also spelled al-Mufakkir al-Sharqi) is a Syrian village located in the Barri Sharqi Subdistrict of the Salamiyah District in the Hama Governorate.  According to the Syria Central Bureau of Statistics (CBS), Mafkar Sharqi had a population of 802 in the 2004 census. Its inhabitants are predominantly Ismaili Shia Muslims.

References 

Populated places in Salamiyah District
Ismaili communities in Syria